Żewłakow is a Polish surname. Notable people with the surname include:

 Marcin Żewłakow (born 1976), Polish footballer
 Michał Żewłakow (born 1976), Polish footballer

Polish-language surnames